Tonna is the name of a village and community in Neath Port Talbot, Wales, located to the north-east of Neath.

Immediately between Tonna and the adjoining parish of Llanilltud ("Llantwit-juxta-Neath") is a cottage once occupied by the Welsh-born engineer and naturalist Alfred Russel Wallace, who had arrived at his theory of evolution independently of Charles Darwin, with whom he later corresponded.  Eventually Wallace and Darwin jointly presented the first paper on Natural Selection to the Linnean Society.

The village's rugby union team is Tonna RFC.

Toponymy
Once mainly agricultural fields, the name derives from the archaic Welsh tonnau, meaning lea or grassland and not, as is sometimes assumed, the modern Welsh for "waves". Some areas of pasture remain.

Government and politics
The electoral ward of Tonna falls within the parliamentary constituency of Neath.  The ward consists of a small built-up area of Tonna village to the northwest with rest of the ward consisting of woodland and pasture. Tonna is bounded by the wards of Aberdulais to the north; Resolven to the northeast; Pelenna to the southeast; Cimla and Neath North to the southwest; and Cadoxton to the west.

In the 2017 local council elections, the electorate turnout was %.  The results were:

References

External links
www.geograph.co.uk : photos of Tonna and surrounding area

Vale of Neath
Villages in Neath Port Talbot
Communities in Neath Port Talbot
Electoral wards of Neath Port Talbot
Towers in Wales
Neath